Etridiazole is a fungicide and pesticide used for prevention of pythium ultimum on cotton plants.

Synthesis
Etridiazole can be synthesised from acetonitrile as follows:

It can also be is produced by the reaction of trichloroacetamidine hydrochloride with trichloromethanesulfenyl chloride, and then with sodium hydroxide in ethanol.

Reactivity
Etridiazole is stable under normal conditions, but degrades upon continuous exposure to sunlight, and is hydrolysed by alkalis. When heated to decomposition, it emits toxic fumes of hydrogen chloride, sulfur oxides, and nitrogen oxides.

Safety
Etridiazole has been classified as a Group B2 Probable Human Carcinogen.

References 

Fungicides
Thiadiazoles
Trichloromethyl compounds